Curimanque Airport,  is an airport  southwest of Pucón, a lakeside city in the La Araucanía Region of Chile.

See also

Transport in Chile
List of airports in Chile

References

External links
OpenStreetMap - Curimanques
OurAirports - Curimanques
FallingRain - Curimanques Airport

Airports in La Araucanía Region